PK-1 Upper Chitral is a constituency for the Khyber Pakhtunkhwa Assembly of the Khyber Pakhtunkhwa province of Pakistan.It covers area of Upper Chitral District.

Election 2013

Election 2018

See also 
 PK-115 Dera Ismail Khan-V
 PK-2 Lower Chitral

References

External links 
 Khyber Pakhtunkhwa Assembly's official website
 Election Commission of Pakistan's official website
 Awaztoday.com Search Result
 Election Commission Pakistan Search Result

Khyber Pakhtunkhwa Assembly constituencies
Chitral District